Relyovo Peninsula is the predominantly ice-covered  peninsula projecting from Danco Coast, Antarctic Peninsula 4.8 km into Gerlache Strait south of Duarte Cove and north of Brialmont Cove.  It ends in Renzo Point and Charles Point to the west.  The interior of the peninsula is occupied by the westerly part of Sonketa Ridge.

The feature is named after the settlement of Relyovo in Western Bulgaria.

Location
British mapping in 1978.

Maps
 British Antarctic Territory.  Scale 1:200000 topographic map.  DOS 610 Series, Sheet W 64 60.  Directorate of Overseas Surveys, UK, 1978.
 Antarctic Digital Database (ADD). Scale 1:250000 topographic map of Antarctica. Scientific Committee on Antarctic Research (SCAR). Since 1993, regularly upgraded and updated.

References
 Relyovo Peninsula. SCAR Composite Antarctic Gazetteer.
 Bulgarian Antarctic Gazetteer. Antarctic Place-names Commission. (details in Bulgarian, basic data in English)

External links
 Relyovo Peninsula. Copernix satellite image

Bulgaria and the Antarctic
Peninsulas of Graham Land
Danco Coast